The Centre contre les manipulations mentales (Centre against mind control), widely named CCMM or Centre Ikor Roger, is a French anti-cult association.

History
The association was founded in 1981 by the writer Roger Ikor, winner of the Prix Goncourt in 1955, after the suicide of his son, a follower of Zen macrobiotics.

The CCMM was chaired from 1997 to 1998 by Alain Vivien. Before resigning to become president of the Interministerial Mission for the Fight against Sects (MILS), he hired his wife Patricia as executive director. Patricia Vivien had an important role in the CCMM, and eventually was said to have more power than the president.

Criticism
The writings of CCMM are a source of information for organizations such as MIVILUDES. The CCMM was sometimes criticized, notably because of financial disclosure and the important role of Patricia Vivien when Alain Vivien was president of MIVILUDES, which led to collusion between the two associations.

Priest Jean Vernette criticized the association for the publication of its book entitled Dictionnaire des sectes which contains a list of cults, including some Roman Catholic groups.

References

External links
 Official site

French anti-cult organizations and individuals
Organizations established in 1981
Anti-cult organizations